Sebastião Roque Rabelo Mendes (9 October 1929 – 11 March 2020) was a Brazilian Roman Catholic bishop. 

Mendes was born in Brazil and was ordained to the priesthood in 1954. He served as bishop of the Roman Catholic Diocese of Leopoldina, Brazil, from 1985 to 1989. Mendes then served as titular bishop of Ploahe and as auxiliary bishop of the Roman Catholic Archdiocese of Belo Horizonte, Brazil, from 1989 to 2004.

Notes

1929 births
2020 deaths
20th-century Roman Catholic bishops in Brazil
21st-century Roman Catholic bishops in Brazil
Roman Catholic bishops of Belo Horizonte
Roman Catholic bishops of Leopoldina